TX Leonis, also known by its Flamsteed designation 49 Leonis, is a triple star system that includes an eclipsing binary, located in the constellation Leo. It was discovered to be a variable star, showing eclipses, by Ernst-Joachim Meyer in 1933.  The apparent magnitude of TX Leonis ranges between 5.66 and 5.75, making it faintly visible to the naked eye for an observer located well outside of urban areas. The star's brightness drops by 0.09 and 0.03 magnitudes during the primary and secondary eclipses respectively, and neither the primary nor the secondary eclipse is total. 

TX Leonis is a triple star, consisting of magnitude 8.1 star (component B) separated by 2 arc seconds from the brighter eclipsing pair (components Aa and Ab).  Although orbital motion has not been detected, the companion shares a common proper motion with the primary star and is at approximately the same distance.

Both stars comprising the eclipsing binary are main sequence stars.

References

Algol variables
Leo (constellation)
Tauri, 049
51802
91636
Durchmusterung objects
Leonis, TX